Phasing and Recoverability is a 1997 book by Daniel Silverman in which the author provides a hypothesis that examines not only at the physical structure of speech, but also the phonological issue of salience. The book is a revised edition of Silverman's 1995 UCLA dissertation.

Reception
The book was reviewed by Kimary Shahin (from Birzeit University/University of British Columbia) and Stefan Frisch (from University of Michigan).

References

External links
Phasing and Recoverability

1997 non-fiction books
Phonology books
Theses
Phonetics books